(Asian Highway Network ) is one of the Expressways of Japan from Kitakyūshū (and the bridge to Honshū) to west of Kagoshima linking with the Higashikyushu Expressway and the Ibusuki Skyline.  It runs through the prefectures of Fukuoka, the eastern half of the Saga, Kumamoto, Miyazaki (Ebino only) and the Kagoshima prefectures.  The freeway runs entirely on the island of Kyūshū.  The total length is 346.2 km.  It does not cover Ōita or Nagasaki.

History 
 June 30, 1971, a section from Ueki to Kumamoto was opened to traffic
 October 21, 1972, a section from Nankan to Ueki opened to traffic
 November 16, 1973, Tosu Interchange and Junction to Nankan was opened to traffic
 December 13, 1973, Kajiki Interchange to Satsuma-Yoshida was opened to traffic
 March 13, 1975, Koga Interchange to Tosu Junction was opened to traffic
 March 4, 1976, Ebuno Junction with the Miyazaki Expressway to Ebuno Interchange was opened.
 November 26, 1976, The section was opened to traffic from Kumatoto to Mifune Interchanges
 November 29, 1976, a section from Mizobe Kagoshimna Airport to Kajiki Interchanges was opened
 July 21, 1977, a section from Wakamiya to Koga was open to traffic
 November 15, 1977, a section from Satsuma-Yoshida to Kagoshima-Kita Interchanges was opened
 December 15, 1978, a section from Mifune to Matsubase Interchanges was opened
 March 8, 1979, a section from Wakamiya to Yahata Interchanges was opened
 March 12, 1980, a section from Matsubase to Yatsushiro Interchanges was opened
 March 22, 1980 a section from Kurino to Mizobe-Kagoshima Airport was opened
 October 1, 1981, a section from Ebuno Junction to Kurino Interchange opened made that section ran from Ebuno to Kagoshima-Kita interchanges that time
 March 27, 1984, a section from Moji to Kokura-Higashi was opened which made access to the bridge with Honshū
 March 28, 1985, the Tosu Junction in the west was opened.
 February 5, 1987, the Tosu Junction in the east was opened.
 March 29, 1988, a section from Kagoshima-Kita to Kagoshima was opened with an interchange with the expressway.
 March 31, 1988, a section from Kokura-Higashi to Yahata was opened to traffic
 October 19, 1988, a section in the Kagoshima Interchange with the Minami Kyushu Expressway was opened
 December 7, 1989, a section from Yatsushiro to Hitoyoshi was opened to traffic
 March 25, 1992, a section in the Kajiki Interchange with the road was opened
 March 31, 1993, the Shin-Moji Interchange was opened
 July 27, 1995, a section from Hitoyoshi to Ebuno was opened to traffic which made the Kyushu Expressway from Moji to Kagoshima fully accessible with no gaps.
 April 20, 1998, the Yatsushiro Junction was opened to traffic with another freeway
 December 19, 2001, Kajiki Junction was opened to traffic
 December 12, 2004, the tunnel from Hitoyoshi to Ebino Interchanges which made Kyushu Expressway with four lanes now being connected with no gaps
 February 26, 2006, Kitakyushu Junction was opened to traffic with another freeway
 March 29, 2009, the Miyama-Yanagawa Interchange was opened
 February 19, 2011, the Kurate Interchange was opened
 April 14, 2016, Many sections of the expressway were damaged during the 2016 Kumamoto earthquakes.
 April 29, 2016, The expressway reopened.

List of interchanges and features 

 IC - interchange, SIC - smart interchange, JCT - junction, SA - service area, PA - parking area, BS - bus stop, TN - tunnel, TB - toll gate, BR - bridge
 Bus stops labeled "○" are currently in use; those marked "◆" are closed.

The section between Yatsushiro Junction and Ebino Interchange consists of tunnels that run in the mountainous areas; vehicles carrying dangerous goods are forbidden from travelling through these tunnels and must use alternate routes.

Lanes 

 6-lane, Dazaifu to Kurume Interchanges
 4-lane, Moji to Dazaifu Interchange and from Kurume to Kagoshima Interchanges

References

External links 
 (in Japanese)

Expressways in Japan
AH1
Kyushu region